Santosh Shukla was a politician from Kanpur, Uttar Pradesh, India, affiliated with the Bharatiya Janata Party. He served as the Minister of State in chief minister Rajnath Singh's cabinet from 2000 to 2001.

Political career 
In 1996, Santosh Shukla contested the assembly election from the Chaubepur Assembly constituency on a BJP ticket. He stood second by securing 43418 votes. He was made the Minister of State in Rajnath Singh's ministry. He was also the chairman of the Labor Contract Board.

Death 
In October 2001, he was shot dead allegedly by Vikas Dubey, a BSP leader and gangster along with his 7 henchmen armed with rifles and country-made pistols inside the Shivli police station. Vikas Dubey was the prime accused in the killing of Santosh Shukla. Dubey was arrested but was later released, allegedly due to his political influence.

References 

Uttar Pradesh politicians
People from Kanpur Dehat district
Bharatiya Janata Party politicians from Uttar Pradesh
2001 deaths
People murdered in Uttar Pradesh
Assassinated Indian politicians